Buck Rogers is a 1939  science fiction film serial, produced by Universal Pictures. It stars Buster Crabbe (who had previously played the title character in two Flash Gordon serials and would return for a third in 1940) as the eponymous hero, Constance Moore, Jackie Moran and Anthony Warde. It is based on the Buck Rogers character created by Philip Francis Nowlan, who had appeared in magazines and comic strips since 1928.

Plot
In 1938, Lieutenant Buck Rogers (Buster Crabbe) and Buddy Wade (Jackie Moran) are part of the crew of a dirigible flying over the North Pole. They are caught in a savage storm and crash. They are ordered to release the experimental Nirvano Gas, which (unbeknownst to them) will put them in suspended animation until they are  rescued. The Nirvano Gas works, but the dirigible is buried in an avalanche and is not found until 500 years have passed. When Buck and Buddy are found, they awaken in the year 2440 to a world ruled by the ruthless dictator, Killer Kane (Anthony Warde), and his army of "super-racketeers". Only those who live in the "Hidden City", run by the benevolent scientist Dr. Huer (C. Montague Shaw) and his military counterpart, Air Marshal Kragg (William Gould), resist the criminal rulers of Earth.

Buck and Buddy join the resistance. They volunteer to go to Saturn, where they hope that they can find help in their fight against Kane. Wilma Deering (Constance Moore) is assigned to accompany them. Saturn is run by Aldar (Guy Usher), the Council of the Wise and Prince Tallen. To the dismay of Buck and Buddy, they also discover that Kane has dispatched ambassadors of his own, headed by his loyal henchman, Captain Laska (Henry Brandon). The serial then becomes a back-and-forth struggle between Buck and Kane to secure the planet's military support.

Chapters
Source:
 "Tomorrow's World"
 "Tragedy on Saturn"
 "The Enemy's Stronghold"
 "The Sky Patrol"
 "The Phantom Plane"
 "The Unknown Command"
 "Primitive Urge"
 "Revolt of the Zuggs"
 "Bodies Without Minds"
 "Broken Barriers"
 "A Prince in Bondage"
 "War of the Planets"

Cast
 Buster Crabbe as Buck Rogers
 Constance Moore as Wilma Deering
 Jackie Moran as George "Buddy" Wade
 Anthony Warde as "Killer" Kane
 C. Montague Shaw as Doctor Huer
 Jack Mulhall as Captain Rankin
 Guy Usher as Aldar
 William Gould as Air Marshal Kragg
 Philson Ahn as Prince Tallen
 Henry Brandon as Captain Laska
 David Sharpe as Kane pilot / Hidden City sentry / Saturnian lieutenant

Production
The 12-part serial launched in 1939. Buster Crabbe had played Flash Gordon in the serials of the same name and Flash Gordon's Trip to Mars. Constance Moore played Lieutenant Wilma Deering, the sole female character, and Jackie Moran as "Buddy" Wade, an original character who was modeled on the Sunday strip character Buddy Deering. Anthony Warde was cast as "Killer" Kane, Rogers' enemy; this was the only time that Warde, who usually portrayed evil underlings in serials, played a lead villain. Korean-American actor Philson Ahn, younger brother of Philip Ahn, played Prince Tallen, a Saturnian native who befriends Rogers.

Noted actor and "crown prince of stuntmen" David Sharpe, who appeared in over 4,500 films over the course of a seven-decade career, appeared in several roles.

The serial had a small budget and saved money on special effects by re-using material from other stories: background shots from the futuristic 1930 musical Just Imagine, as the city of the future, the garishly stenciled walls from the Azura palace set in Trip to Mars, and even the studded leather belt that Crabbe wore in Trip, turned up as part of Buck's uniform.

Feature adaptations
In 1953, the serial was edited into a feature film entitled Planet Outlaws, by Sherman Krellberg for release via Goodwill Pictures Inc. It was edited again to feature length and titled Destination Saturn for syndication to television, in 1965. Finally, the serial was edited once again into feature film format in the late 1970s, this version simply entitled Buck Rogers with the theatrical poster advertising, "Star Wars owes it all to Buck Rogers", and which was later sold on videotape in the early 1990s by VCI Entertainment under the catalogue title of Planet Outlaws (which title, to make it appear legitimate, was also superimposed onto the first shot of film following the main titles). The original "Planet Outlaws" and also "Destination Saturn" have both been available in video format since the early 1980s, and as early as 1970 were both available for user-purchase in 16mm film format from Thunderbird Pictures. VCI released all twelve installments on DVD in September 2000. In November 2009, VCI released a special 70th anniversary edition on DVD, with extras including "The History of Buck Rogers" by Clifford "Laughing Gravy" Weimer, a photo gallery, and the 1935 Buck Rogers short feature originally shown at the 1933-34 World's Fair.

Legacy
Planet Outlaws received comedic commentary treatment in 2018 as a "...Presents" feature by Matthew J. Elliott and Ian Potter as part of RiffTrax, an offshoot of cult movie-mocking TV series Mystery Science Theater 3000.

See also
 List of film serials by year
 List of film serials by studio

References

External links
 "Buck Rogers" OFFICIAL WEBSITE(c) The Dille Family Trust 
 
 
 
 Buck Rogers.com

1939 films
1930s science fiction adventure films
American black-and-white films
American science fiction adventure films
American space adventure films
1930s English-language films
Films based on comic strips
Films directed by Ford Beebe
Films set in 1938
Films set in the future
Films set in the 25th century
Universal Pictures film serials
Buck Rogers
1930s American films